Anthopterus is a genus of flowering plants belonging to the family Ericaceae.

Its native range is Costa Rica to Peru.

Species:

Anthopterus costaricensis 
Anthopterus cuneatus 
Anthopterus ecuadorensis 
Anthopterus gentryi 
Anthopterus molaui 
Anthopterus oliganthus 
Anthopterus pterotus 
Anthopterus racemosus 
Anthopterus revolutus 
Anthopterus schultzeae 
Anthopterus verticillatus 
Anthopterus wardii

References

Ericaceae
Ericaceae genera